Clarksburg is a city in and the county seat of Harrison County, West Virginia, United States, in the north-central region of the state. The population of the city was 16,039 at the 2020 census. It is the principal city of the Clarksburg micropolitan area, which had a population of 90,434 in 2020. Clarksburg was named National Small City of the Year in 2011 by the National League of Cities.

History
Indigenous peoples have lived in the area for thousands of years. The Oak Mounds outside Clarksburg were created by the Hopewell culture mound builders between 1 and 1000 C.E.
 
The first known non-indigenous visitor to the area that later became Clarksburg was  John Simpson, a trapper, who in 1764 located his camp on the West Fork River opposite the mouth of Elk Creek at approximately  (39.28128, -80.35145)

Settlement and early history

As early as 1772, settlers began claiming lands near where Clarksburg now stands, and building cabins. In 1773, Major Daniel Davisson (1748-1819) took up , upon which the principal part of the town is now located. By 1774, people settling near present Clarksburg included: Daniel Davisson, Obadiah Davisson (Daniel's father), Amaziah Davisson (Daniel's uncle), Thomas, John, and Matthew Nutter, Samuel and Andrew Cottrill (brothers), Sotha Hickman, and Samuel Beard. Undoubtedly, others located on these public lands, of which no official records were made.
The Virginia General Assembly authorized the town of Clarksburg in 1785. Now a city, it is named for General George Rogers Clark, a Virginian who conducted many expeditions against the British and Indians during the Indian Wars and the war of the American Revolution, including the strategically critical capture of the Forts of Vincennes, now in the State of Indiana, in 1778.

As now-President George Washington had proposed years earlier, the General Assembly also authorized a road from Winchester, Virginia to Morgantown in 1786, and a branch from this road (which decades later became the Northwestern Turnpike) would soon begin through Clarksburg toward the Little Kanawha River (which flows into the Ohio River at Parkersburg). In 1787, the Virginia General Assembly authorized the Randolph Academy at Clarksburg, a private school led by Rev. George Towers and the first west of the Alleghenies. However, although many here as the 19th century began wanted the National Road westward to follow McCulloch's Path (improvements beginning after the Northwestern Turnpike company's formal incorporation by the Virginia General Assembly in 1827), Congress instead authorized construction on an easier route (Nemacolin's Path) through Maryland and Wheeling, which opened in 1818.

Construction of the first Harrison County courthouse began in Clarksburg in 1787. That building was followed by four increasingly larger courthouses; the most recent one completed in 1932. The first Court House stood on what is now the North East Corner of Second and Main Streets; the jail stood on the opposite side of Main Street near where the Presbyterian church now stands.

Relatively poor transportation slowed northwestern Virginia's development, so subscribers in Winchester, Romney, Kingwood, Clarksburg, Parkersburg and other towns en route caused the Northwestern Turnpike to be built. While the toll road increased development around Clarksburg in the 1830s, it also used a relatively anachronistic model. Nonetheless, the Randolph Academy was razed and replaced by the Northwestern Academy in 1841, a year after stage coach service began between Clarksburg and Parkersburg on the Ohio River. Clarksburg's development increased more a decade later due to new technology and further subscriptions. The Baltimore and Ohio Railroad reached Clarksburg from Grafton in 1856.

Two of the modern city's historic buildings date from this prewar era. The Stealey-Goff-Vance House, now owned by the Harrison County Historical Society, was originally constructed in 1807, expanded in 1891 and listed on the National Register of Historic Places in 1979. Waldomore was built beginning in 1839, served as the Clarksburg Public Library from 1931 to 1976 (when a new building was built next door for the majority of the collection), and added to the National Register in 1978.

Civil War

During the Virginia Secession Convention of 1861, both Harrison County delegates opposed secession initially, although delegate (and future U.S. Congressman) Benjamin Wilson abstained from the final vote (which approved the ordinance of secession). Its other delegate, John S. Carlile, became a leader of the Wheeling Convention which led to creation of the Restored Government of Virginia during the American Civil War (during which Carlile served as U.S. Senator), and ultimately creation of the State of West Virginia. On the other hand, Confederate General Stonewall Jackson had been born in Clarksburg in 1824.

Clarksburg's citizenry also reflected this divide. Union General McClellan established his headquarters near Clarksburg until the First Battle of Bull Run. The B&O line made Clarksburg an important Union supply base throughout the war, with at one point more than 7000 troops in the city. It became a target of Confederate raiders, but none actually reached the city, instead striking surrounding areas with fewer defenders. The closest, most famous (and materially successful) raid, the Jones-Imboden Raid of April and May 1863, was designed to impede recognition of West Virginia (which became the 35th state of the Union anyway in June 1863).

Postwar industrialization
In 1877, Clarksburg became one of three cities from which West Virginia voters would select their new state capital. Despite its relatively central location and an early lead, it came in second; Charleston, West Virginia became and remains the state capital.

Around that time Clarksburg gained some industry and manufacturing, particularly involving glass and coal. The city grew slowly but steadily, and services increased apace. The still-functional Despard Building was built in 1870. Telephone service, the first in the state, began in Clarksburg in the mid-1880s. Native son Edwin Maxwell was the Republican nominee for Governor of West Virginia in the 1884 election, though he lost narrowly to Emanuel Willis Wilson. In 1887, Clarksburg laid its first six miles of water lines; downtown streets were lit by electricity in 1889. Nonetheless, in the late 1890s, a visitor called Clarksburg a "sleepy, moss-covered town."

Clarksburg's boom years began around the turn of the century, as coal and glass production increased. The population grew from 4,050 in 1900 to 27,869 in 1920, partly because in 1917 it annexed the previously independent surrounding communities of Adamston, Stealey, North View and Broad Oaks. The population may have reached 35,000 in 1929, before the Great Depression.

In 1894, the Traders' Hotel was constructed, the grandest structure to date. Many buildings in the Clarksburg Downtown Historic District date from that era. In 1900, the first sewer lines were installed, and Main and Pike streets were paved with brick. In 1901, the city's first trolley opened for business (it would cease operating in 1947). Merchants Smith, Brown and Company built an early department store beginning in 1890. The Northwestern Academy was razed in 1894 and the Towers School erected (which became the city's high school). Merchants National Bank built a building in 1894 which later became the Community Bank. Clarksburg's oldest bank, the Empire National Bank, built a seven-story headquarters in 1907. Other significant buildings include the Goff Building (1911), Municipal Building (1888), the Waldo Hotel (1901–1904), Robinson Grand (1912, 1940), Harrison County Courthouse (1931-1932), U.S. Post Office (1932), Masonic Temple (1911–1914), First United Presbyterian Church (1894), and First Methodist Church (1909, 1956).

An automobile had reached Clarksburg in 1902, and that technology fostered further development. In 1928, U.S. Route 50 was paved through Clarksburg. U.S. Interstate 79 would open in 1979 and connect Clarksburg with Charleston as well as Pennsylvania. In 1924, Clarksburg hosted a parade for its "native son", John W. Davis, who had become the "dark horse" Democratic presidential candidate (but lost) to Republican incumbent Calvin Coolidge. The following year, Republican and former U.S. Secretary of Agriculture Howard M. Gore, became Governor of West Virginia. During the 1920s, Clarksburg's Melville Davisson Post (1869-1930) may have been the country's highest paid author, writing 17 novels including the characters of Randolph Mason and Uncle Abner.

As the Great Depression began, the Farmers Bank closed in 1929, and the Bank of West Virginia (which had opened in 1869) failed in 1933. Clarksburg's population dropped to 30,579 by 1940, and further as the decade progressed. Former Gov. Gore served as state agricultural commissioner (1931–33) and later as Public Service Commissioner (1941–47).

However, Clarksburg managed to avoid urban blight and preserved much of the architecture it had gained during the "boom years". It is now West Virginia's tenth largest city. The West Virginia Preservation Alliance, the state's first, was created in Clarksburg in 1981.

Mountaineer Militia
On October 11, 1996, seven men having connections with the Mountaineer Militia, a local anti-government paramilitary group, were arrested on charges of plotting to blow up the Federal Bureau of Investigation's Criminal Justice Information Services Division complex in Clarksburg. While members of the group had been assembling large quantities of explosives and blasting caps, militia leader Floyd Raymond Looker obtained blueprints of the FBI facility from a Clarksburg firefighter. Plastic explosives were confiscated by law enforcement officials at five locations in West Virginia, Pennsylvania, and Ohio. Looker was taken into custody after arranging to sell the blueprints for $50,000 to an undercover FBI agent, whom he believed to be a representative of an international terrorist group. In 1998 Looker was sentenced to 18 years in prison. Two other defendants were sentenced on explosives charges, and the firefighter drew a year in prison for providing blueprints.

Geography

Clarksburg is located in West Virginia's North-Central region. It lies within the ecoregion of the Western Allegheny Plateau.

Clarksburg is located at the junction of U.S. 50 and U.S. 19, two miles west of the junction of U.S. 50 with Interstate 79. The city lies at an elevation of 1,007 feet at the junction of Elk Creek  and the West Fork River of the Monongahela River.

Climate
Clarksburg has a humid continental climate if one considers the 0 °C isotherm. To the molds of Köppen the climate may be considered the southern boundary of the Dfb zone at low altitudes in the North American continent (limit of 39 ° N), although in the immediate vicinity it is Dfa. The city still suffers strong influences from the south, especially from the Gulf of Mexico but due to its location has a much more significant influence of the cold air intrusion of Canada, where it is not protected by the Appalachians. The extent further to the south is due to the eastern and southeastern mountain ranges blocking the oceanic influence in part, even if it is minimal anyway by the considerable distance from the coast. At the same time it can be classified as Cfa or hybrid of different climatic zones according to the criterion to be surveyed, a situation similar to that of Boston. It is the Dfb boundary throughout the northern hemisphere if it is to be disregarded in elevated regions on all continents. The southern record could appear on the Korean peninsula but the dry season defined version (Dwb) predominates in these locations. Since the season of snowfall goes from November to March.

Notes

Nearby places

Demographics

2020 census 
As of the 2020 census, there were 16,061 people and 6,588 households residing in the city. There were 8,129 housing units in Clarksburg. The racial makeup of the city was 88% White, 3.9% African American, 0.5% Asian, 0.2% Native American, 0.9% from other races, and 6.4% from two or more races. Hispanics or Latinos of any race were 3% of the population.

There were 6,588 households, of which 37.4% were married couples living together, 35.2% had a female householder with no spouse present, 20.4% had a male householder with no spouse present.The average household and family size was 3.3. The median age in the city was 39.7 years.

2010 census
As of the census of 2010, there were 16,578 people, 7,213 households, and 4,179 families residing in the city. The racial makeup of the city was 92.9% White, 3.9% African American, 0.2% Native American, 0.3% Asian, 0.3% from other races, and 2.4% from two or more races. Hispanic or Latino of any race were 1.6% of the population.

There were 7,213 households, of which 28.5% had children under the age of 18 living with them, 38.0% were married couples living together, 14.7% had a female householder with no husband present, 5.2% had a male householder with no wife present, and 42.1% were non-families. 35.3% of all households were made up of individuals, and 14.6% had someone living alone who was 65 years of age or older. The average household size was 2.25 and the average family size was 2.91.

The median age in the city was 39.5 years. 21.9% of residents were under the age of 18; 7.9% were between the ages of 18 and 24; 26.8% were from 25 to 44; 27.1% were from 45 to 64; and 16.3% were 65 years of age or older. The gender makeup of the city was 48.0% male and 52.0% female.

2000 census
As of the census of 2000, there were 16,743 people, 7,447 households, and 4,378 families residing in the city. The population density was 1,758.3 people per square mile (679.0/km2). There were 8,662 housing units at an average density of 909.7 per square mile (351.3/km2). The racial makeup of the city was 93.86% White, 3.83% African American, 0.13% Native American, 0.36% Asian, 0.05% Pacific Islander, 0.44% from other races, and 1.34% from two or more races. Hispanic or Latino were 1.06% of the population.

There were 7,447 households, out of which 25.0% had children under the age of 18 living with them, 41.6% were married couples living together, 13.4% had a female householder with no husband present, and 41.2% were non-families. 36.7% of all households were made up of individuals, and 17.3% had someone living alone who was 65 years of age or older. The average household size was 2.20 and the average family size was 2.87.

In the city, the population was spread out, with 21.1% under the age of 18, 8.3% from 18 to 24, 27.3% from 25 to 44, 22.7% from 45 to 64, and 20.7% who were 65 years of age or older. The median age was 40 years. For every 100 females, there were 86.2 males. For every 100 females age 18 and over, there were 81.6 males.

The median income for a household in the city was $27,722, and the median income for a family was $35,075. Males had a median income of $30,194 versus $22,388 for females. The per capita income for the city was $17,587. About 14.8% of families and 19.8% of the population were below the poverty line, including 28.5% of those under age 18 and 11.9% of those age 65 or over.

Belgians
During the first decade of the 20th century, French was frequently spoken on the West Virginia streets of such communities as South Charleston, the North View section of Clarksburg, and the small town of Salem. These neighborhoods shared a connection to the window-glass industry, and the people speaking French often were Walloons, or French-speaking Belgians. About 1900, changes in window-glass manufacture brought thousands of immigrants from the Charleroi area of Belgium just when the industry was expanding into West Virginia to take advantage of cheap natural gas and large deposits of silica sand. For a generation, window-glass factories, many of which were worker-owned cooperatives, relied heavily on these Belgian immigrants to provide the skills necessary to make West Virginia a national center of production.

West Virginia's Belgians came from an area economically similar to West Virginia. The Charleroi basin of the Hainaut province in Belgium was dependent upon coal mining, steel production, and window-glass manufacturing. The Belgians’ new homes in north-central West Virginia and the Kanawha Valley must have felt familiar.

They left Europe because the Belgian glass factories were struggling in the 1880s and 1890s. Equally important, workers had limited opportunities to voice their concerns either politically or economically. Belgian glassworkers found in the United States an effective trade union to represent their workplace concerns and the means to build a vibrant political movement advocating democratic socialism. In fact, some of these Belgian enclaves, including Star City near Morgantown and Adamston (now part of Clarksburg), elected Socialist mayors in the years before World War I. Aside from politics, Belgian ethnic communities also became famous for the cuisine, musical groups, social clubs, and celebrations composing the unique Belgian cultural heritage.

The technological changes that had made skilled Belgian workers so valuable, however, soon gave way to newer technologies that turned window-glass manufacture from a skilled craft to a mass-production industry. By the end of the 1920s, a few large corporations dominated the industry and machines replaced most of the skilled craftsmen. One exception, window-glass cutters, continued to provide opportunities to a new generation of Belgian-Americans. More than 70 years later, the Belgian-American Heritage Society keeps alive the history and culture of this fascinating ethnic group.

Economy

The availability of natural resources, coupled with easy access to railroad facilities, attracted industry and manufacturing to Clarksburg, including chemical plants, brickworks, potteries, foundries and machine shops, hardwood and casket companies, glass factories (including the Akro-Agate marble company), and the Jackson (later Phillips) Sheet and Tin Plate Company, the forerunner of Weirton Steel. Economic development brought successive waves of immigrants in the 19th and early 20th centuries, including Irish, Italians, Greeks, French, Belgians, and Spanish.

Early 20th century Clarksburg boasted eight banks, three hospitals, and several fine hotels, including the elegant seven-story Waldo, which opened in 1909. The seven-story Empire Bank building went up in 1907, the nine-story Goff Building in 1911, and the 10-story Union Bank in 1912.

By 1929, Clarksburg had reached its peak population of 35,115. During the Depression the city lost industry and population, but during World War II the railroad again made it a central clearinghouse. New development came with the construction in the 1970s of Interstate 79 and the new four-lane U.S. 50 Appalachian Corridor D connecting I-79 to I-77, but plant closings in the 1980s had a negative impact. New expansion in the government and technology sectors began in the 1990s, including the relocation of the FBI Criminal Justice Information Services Center to Clarksburg and construction of a new federal building and a new building to house Fairmont State University's Clarksburg branch.

In 1975, Clarksburg opened a new public library designed by Marcel Breuer, adding another distinctive element to its architecturally rich downtown.
The city has a daily newspaper, The Exponent-Telegram, three local television stations, and six radio stations.
Clarksburg is home to Eastpointe and Newpointe, the largest strip mall in West Virginia, adjacent to Interstate 79. Most of Clarksburg's retail has relocated to the strip malls, and downtown is now home to many professional services.[18]

Akro Agate Company
The Akro Agate Company of Clarksburg was a world leader in manufacturing glass marbles. Organized in Akron, Ohio, in 1911 the firm relocated to Clarksburg in 1914 because of the availability of glass sand and cheap natural gas for fuel. The Chinese checkers craze of the 1930s and ’40s helped make the marbles very profitable, with more than 2,000,000 made per week. Beginning in the 1930s a line of pressed glass vases, floral ware, and colorful glass containers was produced. Miniature glass children’s dishes, including tea pots, cups, saucers, and other pieces, were sold as inexpensively boxed sets when World War II limited the availability of metal for toys. The marbles and multicolored pressed articles in similar hues are sought by collectors today. Pressed products can sometimes be identified by the trademark of the letter A with a crow flying through it. The firm, located off South Chestnut Street, ceased production in 1951.

Hazel-Atlas Glass Company
Hazel-Atlas Glass Company, the glassmaking giant in a state known for glass production, was created in 1902 by the merger of four earlier companies. The largest glass company in the United States from the 1930s until the 1950s, Hazel Atlas was a major producer of inexpensive ‘‘depression glass’’ table sets of pink, green, blue, colorless, and black glass. Hundreds of thousands of glass premiums given away in oats, coffee, and other products were made by Hazel Atlas.

Hazel Atlas glass plants in West Virginia included one along the Tygart River in Grafton (1916–60) that largely produced wide-mouth canning jars, and the world's largest tumbler factory in Clarksburg (1902–87). By 1920, the Clarksburg factory had 15 acres of floor space, employed 1,200 people, and shipped all over the world. The company's metal factories in Wheeling made lids and closures for glass containers.

Federal Bureau of Investigation
In July 1995, the Federal Bureau of Investigation completed construction on its Criminal Justice Information Services Division complex in Clarksburg. The $200 million complex, located on 986 acres, is the national repository for the FBI's law enforcement records. The project came about through the efforts of Senator Robert C. Byrd. In 1990, in Byrd's second year as head of the Senate Appropriations Committee, the senator worked to fund the center and get it built in West Virginia, not Washington.

Culture
Clarksburg is a cultural center of the north-central West Virginia region and hosts many events and festivals. Since 1979 Clarksburg has hosted the annual West Virginia Italian Heritage Festival held during Labor Day weekend. Every September since 1991 the city has been the site of the West Virginia Black Heritage Festival. Since 2006 Clarksburg has hosted the annual Glen Elk Wine, Music and Arts festival. Since 1997 Clarksburg has also hosted the Greater Clarksburg 10K race, the official WV 10K State Championship. In 2007 the race was renamed the Jarvis Greater Clarksburg 10K.

Landmarks and attractions

 Oak Mounds
 Waldomore
 Edgewood Manor
 Washington Irving High School
 Liberty High School
 Kelly Miller High School
 Victory High School
 Waldo Hotel

Transportation
Clarksburg is at the crossroads of U.S. Route 50 (Corridor D), the main arterial route for Clarksburg, and Interstate 79. Other major highways include West Virginia Route 20, West Virginia Route 58, U.S. Route 19, and West Virginia Route 98.

The Northwestern Turnpike, now known as U.S. Route 50, chartered in 1827, and began in 1831, reached Clarksburg in 1836 and was macadamized from the Tygarts Valley River to Parkersburg in 1848.

The Baltimore and Ohio Railroad reached Clarksburg from Grafton in 1856.

  Interstate 79
  U.S. Route 50
  U.S. Route 19
  West Virginia Route 20
  West Virginia Route 58
  West Virginia Route 98
  West Virginia Route 279

Clarksburg is served by the North Central West Virginia Airport, approximately 7 miles east of the city.

Notable people

 Tony Anthony: actor, producer, director, and screenwriter
 Hugh Aynesworth: author and journalist
 Babe Barna: Major League Baseball Player 1937-1943
 W. Robert Blair: Illinois politician
 Rex Bumgardner: professional football player, Buffalo Bills (1948–1949) and Cleveland Browns (1950–1952)
 John S. Carlile: American merchant, lawyer, and politician, including a United States Senator, one of West Virginia's founders.
 William W. Chapman: United States politician Iowa and Oregon
 Harry Courtney: professional baseball pitcher and Professional Football Player 1919-1922
 Phyllis Curtin: opera soprano
 John J. Davis: U.S. Congressman, helped found West Virginia
 John W. Davis: Democratic Party nominee for President of the United States in 1924
 Martha Gandy Fales: American art historian and curator; recipient of the Charles F. Montgomery Prize (1995) from the Decorative Arts Society
 Jimbo Fisher: head coach of the Texas A&M Aggies football team.
 Nathan Goff, Jr.: congressman and United States Secretary of the Navy
 Guy D. Goff: son of Nathan Goff, Jr., Served as a US senator and the US DA for the eastern district of Wisconsin
 Howard Mason Gore:  United States Secretary of Agriculture under president Calvin Coolidge
 Mabel Grouitch: American surgical nurse who worked with the Red Cross during World War I
 Robert Graetz: Lutheran clergyman who, as the white pastor of a black congregation in Montgomery, Alabama, Civil Rights Activist
 Bert Hamric Major League Baseball Player
 William S. Haymond US House of Representative, representing Indiana. Civil War surgeon in the Union Army.
 Samuel Lewis Hays 19th Century United States Senator
 Lynn Hornor: represented West Virginia in the United States House of Representatives
 William Lowther Jackson: Confederate General during the American Civil War
 Thomas "Stonewall" Jackson: Confederate lieutenant-general during the American Civil War
 Edward B. Jackson: Member of the 16th Congress to fill the vacancy caused by the resignation of James Pindall and reelected to the 17th Congress, served from October 23, 1820, to March 3, 1823
 Porter Jarvis, President of Swift & Company, Chicago. 
 John David Jamerson: Standout NCAA basketball player for Ohio University and NBA player selected by the Miami Heat in the 1st round (15th overall) of the 1990 NBA Draft.
 Louis A. Johnson: United States Secretary of Defense
 Tuffy Knight: former coach in Canadian university football, and a member of the Canadian Football Hall of Fame
 Charles S. Lewis: member of the 33rd Congress to fill the vacancy caused by the death of John F. Snodgrass
 Pare Lorentz: film director
 Frank Loria: Virginia Tech Hokies football All American player. He later died in the Southern Airlines Flight 932 airplane crash, that killed most of Marshall University's football team, on November 14, 1970
 Lloyd Lowndes, Jr.: Governor of Maryland

Bruce Marks (born 1957), American politician
 Joseph M. Minard: Democratic member of the West Virginia Senate
 Ken Moore: Professional Football player for the New York Giants
 Frederick Mosteller: founding chairman of Harvard's statistics department
 Elliott Northcott: Federal Judge appointed by President Calvin Coolidge on April 6, 1927
 Dave Nutter: Virginia House of Delegates
 Mike Patrick: ESPN sportscaster
 Melville Davisson Post: author of the Uncle Abner detective fiction series from 1911 to 1928
 Jay Randolph: sportscaster, son of senator Jennings Randolph
 Stuart F. Reed: politician who represented West Virginia in the United States House of Representatives
 Emily Shaffer: Actress

 Thomas Thomas (boxer): heavyweight boxer, Once rated #6 in the world
 Cyrus Vance: United States Secretary of State
 Patty Weaver: actress, The Young and the Restless (1982–present), Days of Our Lives (1974–1982)
 Sam Wetzel US Army General
 Sherilyn Wolter: actress who has appeared television soap operas.
 Kirsten Wyatt: Broadway actress, Grease (2007–present).
 Jean Yancey: women's small business consultant, motivational speaker.

See also
Pepperoni roll

References

External links

 

 
Cities in West Virginia
Cities in Harrison County, West Virginia
Northwestern Turnpike
County seats in West Virginia
Clarksburg micropolitan area
Coal towns in West Virginia